Republic road I-9 is a major road in Eastern Bulgaria. It runs between the village of Durankulak, at the border with Romania, and the Malko Tarnovo border crossing to Turkey. Most of it provides one driving lane per direction. On it entire length, Road I-9 follows European route E87. In its southernmost section the road runs through Strandzha Nature Park.

References

External links
Road network of Bulgaria at RIA

Roads in Bulgaria